Todor "Toša" Jovanović (June 2, 1845 – February 17, 1893) was a Serbian actor of the 19th century. He was a member of Croatian National Theatre in Zagreb and National Theatre in Belgrade. 

He was famous for his actings of characters of lovers and heroes. The National theatre in Zrenjanin is named after him.

References

Serbian male actors
1845 births
1893 deaths
19th-century male actors
19th-century Serbian actors